The New Democratic Party of Manitoba (NDP) fielded a full slate of 57 candidates in the 1969 provincial election, and won 28 seats to emerge as the largest party in the provincial legislature.  After a brief period of political uncertainty, the party was able to form a minority government.

Many of the party's candidates have their own biography pages; information about others may be found here.  This page also includes information about New Democratic Party candidates in by-elections between 1969 and 1971.

Candidates

Birtle-Russell: Donald Kostesky
Donald Kostesky was 22 years old in 1969, and was a farmer in Rossburn.  He joined the New Democratic Party in 1964, and first ran for the party in a February 1969 by-election.  He finished a close second in the general election, despite the fact that his party did not have strong historical roots in the Birtle-Russell division.  His brother, Ronald Kostesky, was a New Democratic Party candidate in the 1966 provincial election.

Kostesky was listed as the CEO and general-manager of Farmers Co-op Seed Plant Ltd. in 1994.  He is now retired from farming, but remains CEO of the seed co-operative, which has been renamed Red Sper Enterprises Ltd.

Morris: William Loftus
William Thomas Loftus (June 21, 1916 – August 6, 2008) was raised and educated in the Norwood area of Winnipeg, and attended the University of Manitoba.  He was a farmer in La Salle at the time of the election.  He was also an Air Canada captain of long standing, having joined the service in 1944.  In religion, he was a member of the United Church of Canada.

Loftus ran as a New Democratic Party candidate in three provincial elections, in an area where the party did not have a strong organizational base.  He later worked for the government, after the NDP won election under Edward Schreyer's leadership.

References

1969